

Works

Births
 Immanuel the Roman (died 1328), Italian-Jewish scholar and satirical poet
 Albertino Mussato (died 1329), Early Renaissance Italian statesman, poet, historian and dramatist
 Dom Dinis (died 1325), an Occitan troubadour and King of Portugal

Deaths

13th-century poetry
Poetry